The Sopwith  Strutter was a British single- or two-seat multi-role biplane aircraft of the First World War.  It was the first British two-seat tractor fighter and the first British aircraft to enter service with a synchronised machine gun. It was given the name  Strutter because of the long and short cabane struts that supported the top wing. The type was operated by both British air services and was in widespread but lacklustre service with the French .

Design and development
[[File:An aeroplane leaving the deck of the Australia on a reconnaissance trip (13960807682).jpg|thumb|Sopwith 1 1/2 Strutter biplane aircraft taking off from a platform built on top of HMAS Australias midships 'Q' turret. 1918]]
In December 1914, the Sopwith Aviation Company designed a small, two-seat biplane powered by an  Gnome rotary engine, which became known as the "Sigrist Bus" after Fred Sigrist, the Sopwith works manager. The Sigrist Bus first flew on 5 June 1915 and although it set a new British altitude record on the day of its first flight, only one was built, serving as a company runabout.Jarrett 2009, p. 56.

The Sigrist Bus formed the basis for a new, larger, fighter aircraft, the Sopwith LCT (Land Clerget Tractor), designed by Herbert Smith and powered by a  Clerget engine. Like the Sigrist Bus, each of the upper wings (there was no true centre section) was connected to the fuselage by a pair of short (half) struts and a pair of longer struts, forming a "W" when viewed from the front; this giving rise to the aircraft's popular nickname of the  Strutter. The first prototype was ready in mid-December 1915, undergoing official testing in January 1916.Bruce 28 September 1956, p. 544.

The  Strutter was of conventional wire-braced, wood and fabric construction. The pilot and gunner sat in widely separated tandem cockpits, with the pilot in front, giving the gunner a good field of fire for his Lewis gun. The aircraft had a variable-incidence tailplane that could be adjusted by the pilot in flight and airbrakes under the lower wings to reduce landing distance.Jarrett 2009, pp. 56, 8.

The Vickers-Challenger synchronisation gear was put into production for the Royal Flying Corps (RFC) in December 1915 and in a few weeks, a similar order for the Scarff-Dibovski gear was placed for the RNAS.Bruce 5 October 1956, p. 586. Early production  Strutters were fitted with one or the other of these gears for the fixed .303-in Vickers machine gun; due to a shortage of the new gears some early aircraft were built with only the observer's gun. Later aircraft were either fitted with the Ross or the Sopwith-Kauper gears. No early mechanical synchronisation gear was reliable and it was not uncommon for propellers to be damaged or shot away.

The Scarff ring mounting was also new and production was at first slower than that of the aircraft requiring them. Various makeshift Lewis mountings as well as the older Nieuport ring mounting, were fitted to some early  Strutters as a stopgap.  The two-seaters could carry four  bombs underwing, which could be replaced by two  bombs for anti-submarine patrols. From the beginning, a light bomber version was planned, with the observer's cockpit eliminated to allow more fuel and bombs to be carried in the manner of the Martinsyde Elephant and the B.E.12, with an internal bomb bay capable of carrying four  bombs.Bruce 2000, p. 6.

Operational history

In British service
The prototype two seater flew in December 1915 and production deliveries started to reach the RNAS in February 1916. By the end of April, No. 5 Wing RNAS had a flight equipped with the new aircraft. The Sopwiths were used to escort the wing's Caudron G.4 and Breguet Bre.4 bombers and for bombing.Thetford 1978, p. 292. The War Office had ordered the type for the RFC in March but because Sopwith's production capacity was contracted to the navy, the RFC orders had to be placed with Ruston Proctor and Vickers. Sub-contract production from these manufacturers did not get into its stride until August. Since the Battle of the Somme was planned for the end of June and with the RFC having a shortage of modern aircraft, it was agreed that a number of Sopwiths would be transferred from one service to the other, allowing 70 Squadron to reach the front by early July 1916 with Sopwith-built  Strutters, originally intended for the Navy.

At first, 70 Squadron did very well with their new aircraft. The period of German ascendency known as the Fokker scourge was over and the  Strutter's long range and excellent armament enabled offensive patrolling deep into German-held territory. By January 1917, when 43 Squadron arrived in France, the  Strutter was outclassed as a fighter; a more powerful  Clerget 9B improved performance slightly but too late to reverse the situation. It was still a useful long-range reconnaissance aircraft when it could be provided with adequate fighter escort but was one of the types to suffer severely during "Bloody April", 43 squadron alone suffering 35 casualties, from an officer establishment of 32.Herris and Pearson 2010, p. 51.

Like other early Sopwith types, the  Strutter was very lightly built and its structure did not stand up very well to arduous war service. It was far too stable to make a good dogfighter and the distance between the pilot and the observer's cockpits impeded their communication. The last operational  Strutters in the RFC were replaced by Sopwith Camels in late October 1917.

The type's long range and stability were good qualities for a home defence fighter and it served with 37, 44 and 78 squadrons. Most of the  Strutters supplied to home defence units had been built as two-seaters but many were converted locally to single-seaters to improve performance. Some of these single-seaters were similar to the bomber variant but others were of a different type, known (like similarly adapted Sopwith Camels) as the Sopwith Comic. The cockpit was moved back behind the wings and one or two Lewis guns, either mounted on Foster mountings or fixed to fire upwards, outside the arc of the propeller, replaced the synchronised Vickers.

The RNAS and the RFC (and after April 1918 the Royal Air Force [RAF]) used the type as a trainer after it had been withdrawn from operational service and like the Sopwith Pup, it proved a popular personal aircraft for senior officers.

In French service

The largest user of the Sopwith was actually the French . By May 1916 it was obvious that the pusher Farman and Breguet bombers and reconnaissance aircraft were obsolete and with the failure of their tractor aircraft replacements, particularly the Nieuport 14, the Sopwith was ordered in large numbers from French manufacturers in three versions, the SOP. 1A.2 (two-seat reconnaissance), SOP. 1B.2 (two-seat bomber) and  SOP. 1B.1 (single-seat bomber). While in French service, they equipped a large portion of the French bomber and artillery-observation squadrons and carried out many bombing attacks against industrial and military targets, including the German front lines. It was not as successful against fighters, suffering substantial casualties and downing fewer enemy aircraft than either the aircraft used before it or after. With the belated introduction of the Breguet 14 A.2 and B.2, the last of the Sopwiths were withdrawn from operational service in early 1918 although they would continue in service with training units until after the end of the war.

In other foreign service

Three Belgian squadrons also flew French-built Sopwiths, and surplus French Sopwiths were used by several countries postwar. During the war, several  Strutters that were interned after landing in the Netherlands were purchased for the Dutch .

Over 100  Strutters were also built in Russia by Duks and Lebedev, supplemented by large numbers delivered directly from Britain and France. The  Strutter remained in large scale use by both the Soviet forces and White Russians during the Russian civil war and Polish-Soviet war. Three were captured during this war and used by the Poles in 1919–1920. Other captured ones were used by Baltic states.

The American Expeditionary Force purchased 384 two-seat Strutter observation aircraft and 130 single-seat bombers from France in 1917–18.  While mainly used for training, they were used operationally by the 90th Aero Squadron as an interim measure, due to a shortage of later types. The U.S. Navy used a number of the two-seat Sopwiths, along with Nieuport 28s and Hanriot HD.1s and 2s as ships' aircraft in the early postwar years, testing the use of aircraft from platforms mounted on the turrets of battleships. 

The  Strutter also served with the Imperial Japanese Army Air Force – some examples serving in the Japanese expeditionary force in Siberia during 1918. 

Around 1,500  Strutters were built for the Royal Flying Corps and the Royal Naval Air Service and between 4,200 and 4,500 were built in France.

Variants and designations
Sopwith Land Clerget Tractor (or Sopwith LCT) Sopwith company designation.
Sopwith Type 9400 Admiralty designation for two seater, number from serial of last aircraft in first batch ordered.
Sopwith Type 9700 Admiralty designation for single- seater bomber, number likewise assigned.
Sopwith Two seater RFC designation.
Sopwith  Strutter Unofficial name due to configuration of struts, also used by US Navy.
Sopwith Comic Single seat home defence fighter
Ship(s) Strutter Shipboard version
SOP. 1 French built version.
SOP. 1A.2 two-seat reconnaissance aircraft
SOP. 1B.1 single-seat bomber
SOP. 1B.2 two-seat bomber
SOP. 1E.2 two-seat trainer
LeO 1 Lioré et Olivier licence-built version.
So-shiki Model 1 Japanese licence-built bomber version.
So-Shiki Model 2 Japanese licence-built LeO 1 reconnaissance version.

Operators

Military

 Afghanistan Air Force received a single aircraft from the Soviet Union in September 1921, which remained in existence until at least December 1924.

 Australian Flying Corps
 No. 2 Squadron AFC operated one aircraft for training only.
 No. 4 Squadron AFC used Strutters for training.
 No. 6 (Training) Squadron AFC in the United Kingdom

 Aviation Militaire Belge
 2ème Escadrille 3ème Escadrille 4ème Escadrille 6ème Escadrille Escola de Aviação Militar used three aircraft for liaison and army co-operation duties.

Czechoslovak Legion used four SOP 1 A.2 delivered by the French Aviation Mission in Russia, and at least one Strutter captured from bolsheviks.

 Estonian Air Force operated a single ex-Soviet aircraft.

 Aéronautique Militaire – A total of 72 Escadrilles equipped either wholly or partly.
 Aéronautique Navale

 Hellenic Navy – Six aircraft used in the Asia Minor Campaign against Turkey, 1918–21.

 Imperial Japanese Army Air Service

 Latvian Air Force operated four ex-Soviet aircraft.Humberstone, Richard. Latvian Air Force 1918–1940. London: Blue Rider Publishing, 2000, .
 Aizsargi

 Lithuanian Air Force operated a single ex-Soviet aircraft that landed behind Lithuanian lines during the Lithuanian–Soviet War. Two others may also have been operated.

 Arma de Aviación Militar operated one example (TNCA registration 1-S-68) from c1920–1924.

 Luchtvaart Afdeling used five  Strutters that forced landed in neutral the Netherlands and were interned and subsequently purchased.

 Polish Air Force operated three aircraft captured from the Soviets in 1919–1920.

 Romanian Air Corps

 Imperial Russian Air Force and White Russian forces

 Soviet Air Force

A single aircraft acquired from Russia in 1918.

 Royal Flying Corps
 No. 37 Squadron RFC
 No. 39 Squadron RFC
 No. 43 Squadron RFC
 No. 44 Squadron RFC
 No. 45 Squadron RFC
 No. 46 Squadron RFC
 No. 70 Squadron RFC
 No. 78 Squadron RFC
 No. 143 Squadron RFC
 Royal Naval Air Service
 No. 2 (Naval) Squadron
 No. 5 (Naval) Squadron
 No. 8 (Naval) Squadron

 Aviation Section, U.S. Signal Corps
 United States Army Air Service
 88th Aero Squadron
 90th Aero Squadron
 99th Aero Squadron
 United States Navy

Civil

Two aircraft registered in 1928. R-105 (later LV-BAA) and R-106 (later LV-CAA). One of these two preserved in Florida.

55 aircraft on French civil register in 1922.

At least seven aircraft registered.

Possibly one aircraft from Switzerland in 1926.

Two aircraft, CH-53 registered 9 April 1921, cancelled 9 October 1923. CH-67 registered 5 December 1923, cancelled December 1926 as sold to Sweden.

One civil registered aircraft, G-EAVB.

Survivors

Original Sopwith  Strutter aircraft are preserved at the following locations.
Belgium
 S-88 – On static display at the Royal Museum of the Armed Forces and of Military History in Brussels.

Canada
 Replica – Airworthy at The Great War Flying Museum in Caledon, Ontario.

France
 556 – Sop.1A.2 on static display at the Musée de l'Air et de l'Espace in Paris, Île-de-France.
 2897 – Sop.1B.2 airworthy at the Memorial Flight Association in La Ferté-Alais, Île-de-France.

New Zealand
 Unknown – Under restoration at The Vintage Aviator Limited in Masterton, Wellington. It was previously owned by Fantasy of Flight in Polk City, Florida, and was operated by Argentina before that.

Scotland
 Replica – Undergoing work to airworthy at the National Museum of Flight in East Fortune, East Lothian.

Specifications ( Strutter – two seater, 130 hp Clerget)

See also

References

Notes

Bibliography
 Andersson, Lennart. "Turbulent Origins: The First 30 Years of Aviation in Afghanistan". Air Enthusiast, No 105, May/June 2003, pp. 19–27. ISSN 0143-5450.
 Bruce, J.M. "The Sopwith 1½ Strutter: Historic Military Aircraft No. 14 Part I." Flight, 28 September 1956, pp. 542–546.
 Bruce, J.M. "The Sopwith 1½ Strutter: Historic Military Aircraft No. 14 Part II." Flight, 5 October 1956, pp. 586–591.
 Bruce J.M. British Aeroplanes 1914–18. London: Putnam, 1957.
 Bruce, J.M. The Aeroplanes of the Royal Flying Corps (Military Wing). London: Putnam, 1982. .
 Bruce, J.M. Sopwith 1½ Strutter: Windsock Datafile 34. Berkhampstead, UK: Albatros Productions, Second edition, 1998. .
 Bruce, J.M. Sopwith 1½ Strutter: Volume 2: Windsock Datafile 80. Berkhampstead, UK: Albatros Productions, 2000. .
 Flores, Santiago A. "Skywriters: Mexican Strutter". Aeroplane,  Vol. 38, No. 5, Issue No 445, May 2009, p. 94. London: IPC. ISSN 0143-7240.
 Gerdessen, F. "Estonian Air Power 1918–1945". Air Enthusiast, No. 18, April – July 1982, pp. 61–76. ISSN 0143-5450.
 Herris, Jack and Pearson, Bob Aircraft of World War I. London: Amber Books, 2010: .
 Jarrett, Philip. "Database:The Sopwith 1½ Strutter". Aeroplane,  Vol. 37, No, 12, Issue No 440, December 2009, pp. 55–70. London:IPC. ISSN 0143-7240.
 King, H.F. Sopwith Aircraft 1912–1920 London: Putnam, 1981. .
 
 Kopański, Tomasz Jan. Samoloty brytyjskie w lotnictwie polskim 1918–1930 (British aircraft in the Polish air force 1918–1930)(in Polish). Warsaw: Bellona, 2001. .
 Lake, Jon. The Great Book of Bombers: The World's Most Important Bombers from World War I to the Present Day. St. Paul, Minnesota: MBI Publishing Company, 2002. .
 
 Swanborough, F.G. and Peter Bowers. United States Military Aircraft since 1909. London: Putnam, 1963.
 Swanborough Gordon and Peter Bowers. United States Navy Aircraft since 1911. London: Putnam, Second edition 1976. .
 Taylor, John W.R. "Sopwith 1½ Strutter". Combat Aircraft of the World from 1909 to the Present. New York: G.P. Putnam's Sons, 1969. .
 Thetford, Owen. British Naval Aircraft since 1912. London: Putnam, Fourth edition 1978. .
 Visatkas, C. "The Annals of Lithuanian Aviation". Air Enthusiast'', Number Twenty-nine,  November 1985 – February 1986, pp. 61–66. Bromley, UK:Fine Scroll. ISSN 0143-5450.

External links

 Sopwith Strutter in Russia

1910s British bomber aircraft
1910s British fighter aircraft
1910s British military reconnaissance aircraft
Military aircraft of World War I
Biplanes
1 Strutter
Lioré et Olivier aircraft
Single-engined tractor aircraft
Aircraft first flown in 1915
Rotary-engined aircraft